Euptera schultzei is a butterfly in the family Nymphalidae. It is found in south-eastern Cameroon, the Central African Republic, southern Sudan and the northern and eastern parts of the Democratic Republic of the Congo.

References

Butterflies described in 1998
Euptera